The Nandi Award for Best Male Playback Singer was commissioned in the year 1977. S. P. Balasubrahmanyam holds the successful record of winning most Nandi Awards for Best Playback Singer Male that is 19 times. From 2004, this award is known as Ghantasala Venkateswararao Award for Best Male Playback Singer.

Winners

References

Male Playback Singer